Andrew Sloan Draper (June 21, 1848 – April 27, 1913) was an American educator, author, and jurist.

Biography
He was born in Westford, New York, on June 21, 1848, and is a descendant of early Massachusetts settler James Draper. He graduated from The Albany Academy and Albany Law School. He was a member of the New York State Assembly (Albany Co., 2nd D.) in 1881; and a judge of the United States court of Alabama claims before devoting himself to educational work.

He then served as a member of the Albany School-board, New York State Superintendent of Public Instruction from 1886 to 1892, and superintendent of schools at Cleveland, Ohio, before becoming the President and Regent of the University of Illinois in 1894. In 1902 his right leg was amputated.

He resigned from his presidency in 1904 to become Commissioner of Education of the State of New York.

He died on April 27, 1913, in Albany, New York, of Bright's disease and heart trouble. His widow died in 1928.

Selected works
The Organization and Administration of City-School Systems, 1888
American Schools and American Citizenship, 1891
Public School Pioneering in New York and Massachusetts, 1892
American Universities and National Life

References

1848 births
1913 deaths
19th-century American politicians
Albany Law School alumni
American amputees
Commissioners of Education of the State of New York
Deaths from nephritis
Members of the New York State Assembly
Leaders of the University of Illinois
People from Westford, New York
School board members in New York (state)
The Albany Academy alumni
Writers from New York (state)